European route E 50 is an A-type east–west connection across the European continent.  It connects the key naval port of Brest France with Makhachkala, on the Caspian Sea in the Russian republic Dagestan.

Outlook 
Half the route is on highways and the other half is on provincial roads.

On its way through Europe it crosses several major European routes, such as:

 E60 Brest–Vienna
 E5 Greenock-Algeciras
 E15 Inverness-Algeciras
 E45 Alta-Gela
 E75 Vardø-Pireas

It is one of the longest E roads on the continent.

Since 2014, parts of the road in eastern Ukraine have been under the control of the separatist Donetsk People's Republic and Lugansk People's Republic. During the 2022 Russian invasion of Ukraine, Russia took direct control of the areas in Donbas.

Route 

: Brest - Gouesnou
: Gouesnou - Saint-Brieuc - Tramain - Rennes
: Rennes
: Rennes - La Gravelle
: La Gravelle - Laval - Le Mans
: Le Mans - Ablis
: Ablis - Massy
: Massy - Paris
Boulevard Périphérique: Paris
: Paris - Reims - Châlons-en-Champagne - Metz - Freyming-Merlebach 
: Freyming-Merlebach  - Forbach

 Saarbrücken - Mannheim - Heilbronn - Feuchtwangen - Nürnberg - Waidhaus

: Rozvadov - Plzeň - Prague
: Prague
: Prague (Start of Concurrency with  ) - Humpolec  - Jihlava (End of Concurrency with ) - Brno (End of Concurrency with )
: Brno - Starý Hrozenkov

: Drietoma - Trenčín (Start of Concurrency with  )
: Trenčín - Žilina
: Žilina
: Žilina (End of Concurrency with ) - Martin
: Martin
: Martin - Ružomberok
: Ružomberok - Prešov
: Prešov
: Prešov
: Prešov - Bidovce
: Bidovce - Vyšné Nemecké
 (Note: since April 2021, M12 and M04 Stryi – Kropyvnytskyi – Debaltseve were combined into M30)
: Uzhhorod border - Uzhhorod
: Uzhhorod - Mukachevo (End of Concurrency with ) - Stryi
: Stryi - Ternopil - Khmelnytskyi - Vinnytsia - Uman - Kropyvnytskyi
: Kropyvnytskyi - Oleksandriia - Dnipro - Donetsk - Debaltseve
: Debaltseve - Dovzhansky

: border with Ukraine - Novoshakhtinsk (Start of concurrency with)
: Novoshakhtinsk - Rostov-on-Don - Pavlovskaya (End of concurrency with )
: Pavlovskaya - Armavir - Mineralnye Vody - Beslan - Makhachkala
Major towns along the R217 highway (Russia) include Kropotkin, Nevinnomyssk, Mineralnye Vody, Pyatigorsk, Nalchik, Beslan, Grozny, Gudermes, Khasavyurt, Makhachkala, and Derbent on the Caspian Sea. After skirting the Greater Caucasus, the route continues to Baku.

References

External links 

 UN Economic Commission for Europe: Overall Map of E-road Network (2007)

 
E050
E050
E050
E050
E050
E050
European routes in Ukraine
E50
50